Desmond William McKenzie (15 March 1945 – 25 May 2016) was an Australian rules footballer who played with Richmond in the Victorian Football League (VFL).

Notes

External links 
		

1945 births
Australian rules footballers from Victoria (Australia)
Richmond Football Club players
2016 deaths